is a private educational institution in Kawasaki, Kanagawa, Japan. The institution operates a school of music, a junior college, primary and secondary schools, and a kindergarten.

The first Senzoku Gakuen school, the Hiratsuka Sewing School for Women, was founded in 1924 by Wakao Maeda, followed by the opening of Senzoku Women's Higher School in 1927. Senzoku Gakuen Women's Junior High School was established in 1947, followed by a kindergarten in 1948 and an elementary school in 1949.

College of Music
 is located in Takatsu-ku, Kawasaki, Kanagawa. It was established in 1967; the present name was adopted in 2003.  A Department of Music was established in 1962 under Senzoku Gakuen Junior College, which became the Senzoku Gakuen College of Music in 2003. The school offers both undergraduate and graduate programs.

Junior college
, formerly  shares the Takatsu-ku campus with Senzoku Gakuen College of Music. The two-year program offers courses in music and early childhood education.

 was another junior college in Uozu, Toyama, Japan. The junior college was established in April 1980 by Senzoku Gakuen Group. Enrollment of new students ended in 2000 and the college closed in 2002. It offered courses in literature and music.

Notable alumni
 Takanori Arisawa – Composer and arranger
 Ayaka Hirahara (Faculty of Jazz) – Pop singer
 Kanon Shizaki (Faculty of Rock and Pop) – Voice actress and keyboardist
 Arisa Sugi – Actress
 Yutaka Yamada (Faculty of Acoustic Design) – Composer

References

External links
 Official website 
 Senzoku Gakuen alumni association 

Private universities and colleges in Japan
Universities and colleges in Kanagawa Prefecture
Kawasaki, Kanagawa
Educational institutions established in 1924
Music schools in Japan
Japanese junior colleges
1924 establishments in Japan